Martin Gold (December 26, 1915 – January 14, 2011) was an American composer, pianist, and bandleader born in New York City, New York, United States. He was the pianist and arranger for the Korn Kobblers, a popular 1940s novelty group billed as "America's most nonsensical dance band", but was probably best known as the composer of the song "Tell Me Why", which was a hit for The Four Aces in 1951.

Gold also arranged, conducted, and recorded for RCA Victor light orchestral "mood music" pieces utilizing fully the possibilities of the newly developed Stereophonic sound, with whole sections of violins drifting between right and left speakers. 

He conducted (along with Sid Ramin) The Three Suns' The Sounds of Christmas (RCA, 1955) He produced Peter Nero's first two albums for RCA (1961) and also conducted the accompanying orchestra. While at RCA, he had the distinction of playing on pre-Columbia signed Barbra Streisand's RCA audition demo in March, 1962.

Gold died on January 14, 2011, in Agoura Hills, California, at the age of 95.

References

External links

Brief bio for Marty Gold
Listing from Space Age Pop Music
Article on the Korn Kobblers

1915 births
2011 deaths
American male composers
American conductors (music)
American male conductors (music)
American music arrangers
RCA Victor artists
American bandleaders
Musicians from New York City
20th-century American pianists
20th-century American composers
American male pianists
20th-century American male musicians
Easy listening musicians